Anna Pieri Brignole-Sale (1765–1815) was a Sienese noble and court official. She was a supporter of the French Emperor Napoleon Bonaparte, and became a lady-in-waiting to his second wife, Marie Louise of Austria.

Life

Anna Pieri was born in 1765. She was described as a lively and cultivated Sienese patrician. 
She married the Genoese aristocrat Anton Giulio II Brignole-Sale in 1786.
Her husband came from an old family of Genoa that had given doges to the Republic of Genoa including Giovanni-Francesco Brignole Sale (1635–36) and Gian-Francesco Brignole Sale II (1746–47).
They lived in an apartment on the top floor of the Palazzo Rosso in Genoa, where she hosted Enlightenment intellectuals of the day in her salon.
Anna Pieri's husband Anton-Giulio died in 1802.

Courtier
Anna Pieri often visited Paris during the First French Empire, and was admitted to the court as a lady in waiting to Marie Louise of Austria, the second wife of Napoleon.
She was created countess in 1810 by the emperor.
After Bonaparte was exiled to Elba in 1814, Anna followed Marie Lousie to Austria to try to persuade her to remain faithful to Napoleon and to sustain him during this difficult time.
However, the court became increasingly hostile to Napoleon and suspicious of Anna, who was guarded by secret police in the Schönbrunn Palace, where she died in 1815.

Legacy
The Villa Duchessa di Galliera in Genoa today has the only 18th century theatre in Liguria, inaugurated in 1786. 
Anna Pieri Brignole Sale commissioned the neoclassical decoration by the painter Giuseppe Canepa.

Issue
Anna Pieri's son, Anton Giulio IV Brignole-Sale, 11th Marquess of Groppoli (1786–1863), attended the Congress of Vienna as a member of the Genoa Commission for restoration of the statehood of Genoa.  He was rumored, probably without foundation, to be acting as the agent of Napoleon and Joachim Murat. Although he had a large sum of money to advance the cause, he did not succeed.   
She also had a daughter, Thérèse-Catherine de Brignole-Sale (1787–1865).
Her granddaughter, Maria Brignole-Sale (1812–88) became Duchess of Galliera by marriage.

Notes

Sources

1765 births
1815 deaths
18th-century Italian women
19th-century Italian women
French ladies-in-waiting
Nobility of the First French Empire
Counts of the First French Empire
Italian salon-holders